Sir Neil James Douglas (28 May 1949 – 23 August 2020) was a medical doctor and was president of the Royal College of Physicians of Edinburgh (RCPE) 2004–2010 and chairman of the Academy of Medical Royal Colleges (AoMRC) 2009–2012.

Career
He was a professor of respiratory and sleep medicine at the University of Edinburgh and an honorary consultant physician at the Royal Infirmary of Edinburgh. He established the National Scottish Sleep Laboratory at the Edinburgh City Hospital. 

In December 2003, he was announced as President-elect of the Royal College of Physicians of Edinburgh, taking up the post of president in March 2004. He was re-elected in December 2008. and held office until 2010. He was chairman of the Academy of Medical Royal Colleges 2009–2012.

When the Medical Training Application Service (MTAS) was set up in 2007- with multiple problems evident- he chaired the initial MTAS review group.

He was Chairman of the Founding Council of the Faculty of Medical Leadership and Management (FMLM).

On retirement, he was Professor of Respiratory and Sleep Medicine (Emeritus) at the University of Edinburgh.

Death
Sir Neil Douglas died on 23 August 2020, aged 71.

Awards and honours
In 2007, he was bestowed with an Honorary Doctor of Medicine by the University of St Andrews.

In the 2009 New Year Honours, he was made Knight Bachelor for services to Medicine.

References

External links
 portrait at artuk.org
 profile at University of Edinburgh
 research profile at University of Edinburgh

1949 births
2020 deaths
Medical doctors from Edinburgh
People associated with Dundee
People educated at the High School of Dundee
People educated at Glenalmond College
Alumni of the University of St Andrews
Alumni of the University of Edinburgh Medical School
Academics of the University of Edinburgh
20th-century Scottish medical doctors
21st-century Scottish medical doctors
Presidents of the Royal College of Physicians of Edinburgh
Knights Bachelor